FC Inhulets-2 Petrove was the reserve team of professional Ukrainian football club Inhulets Petrove from the town of Petrove, Kirovohrad Oblast.

History

The first appearance of the club was in 2013 when they competed in the Kirovohrad oblast Premier League "West" competition. The club was called FC AF Pyatykhatska-2 Volodymyrivka. The team finished second in the competition to their senior squad.

The following season in 2015 the team won the Kirovohrad oblast Premier League "East" competition as FC Inhulets-2 Petrove, and followed that by winning the Kirovohrad oblast championship.

After the senior team was admitted to the 2015-16 Ukrainian Second League, Inhulets-2 Petrove continued the club's participation in the 2015 Ukrainian Football Amateur League with its second team Inhulets-2 reaching the second stage of the competition.

The club again competed in 2016 in the 2016 Amateur League finishing third in their group as well as participation in the 2016 Kirovohrad oblast Premier League "East" competition.
On promotion of the senior team to the Ukrainian First League in 2016 due to expansion of the competition, the club also applied that the reserve team enter the PFL.

The club successfully passed attestation and will compete in the 2016–17 Ukrainian Second League season.

Honors
 FFU Regions' Cup 
 Winners (1): 2015-2016
 Kirovohrad Oblast Championship
 Winner (1): 2015
 Runner-up: 2014 ("East")

League and cup history

{|class="wikitable"
|-bgcolor="#efefef"
! Season
! Div.
! Pos.
! Pl.
! W
! D
! L
! GS
! GA
! P
!Cup
!colspan=2|Europe
!Notes
|-bgcolor=SteelBlue
|align=center|2015
|align=center|4th
|align=center|4
|align=center|3	 	 	
|align=center|1 	 	 	
|align=center|0 	 	 	
|align=center|2 	 	 	 	
|align=center|1	 	
|align=center|6	 	 	 		
|align=center|3
|align=center| finals
|align=center|
|align=center|
|align=center|Replaced FC Inhulets Petrove in finals
|-bgcolor=SteelBlue
|align=center|2016
|align=center|4th
|align=center|3
|align=center|6	 	 	
|align=center|1 	 	 	
|align=center|1 	 	 	
|align=center|4 	 	 	 	
|align=center|4	 	
|align=center|11	 	 	 		
|align=center|4
|align=center|
|align=center|
|align=center|
|align=center|failed to qualify for finals
|-bgcolor=PowderBlue
|align=center|2016–17
|align=center|3rd
|align=center|6
|align=center|32 	 	 	
|align=center|14 	 	 	
|align=center|8 	 	 	
|align=center|10 	 	 	 	
|align=center|50 		 	
|align=center|33 	 	 	 		
|align=center|50
|align=center|
|align=center|
|align=center|
|align=center|
|-bgcolor=PowderBlue
|align=center|2017–18
|align=center|3rd
|align=center|10
|align=center|33  
|align=center|4  	
|align=center|7  	
|align=center|22  
|align=center|29  	 	
|align=center|70
|align=center|19
|align=center|
|align=center|
|align=center|
|align=center bgcolor=pink|dissolved after the season
|}

Coaches
 2014–2016: Yevhen Proshenko
 2016–2017: Andriy Kononenko (previously with FC Barsa Sumy)
 2017–2018: Mykola Fedorko

Inhulets-3 Petrove
After Inhulets-2 was promoted to the Ukrainian Second League in 2016, Inhulets entered its third team Inhulets-3 to the 2016-17 Ukrainian Football Amateur League.

{|class="wikitable"
|-bgcolor="#efefef"
! Season
! Div.
! Pos.
! Pl.
! W
! D
! L
! GS
! GA
! P
!Cup
!colspan=2|Europe
!Notes
|-bgcolor=SteelBlue
|align=center|2016–17
|align=center|4th
|align=center|12
|align=center|4	 	 	
|align=center|0	 	 	
|align=center|1	 	 	
|align=center|3	 	 	 	
|align=center|6		 	
|align=center|12	 	 	 		
|align=center|1
|align=center|
|align=center|RC
|align=center|Finals
|align=center bgcolor=pink|withdrew
|}

For the 2017 UEFA Regions' Cup where Ukraine was represented by a team of Kirovohrad Oblast (Kirovograd Region according to the UEFA), which was composed out of the Inhulets' reserve team, UEFA admitted the team under the name of "Ingulee, Kirovograd Region", later Ingulec.

References

External links
 Official website for Inhulets-2

FC Inhulets Petrove
Football clubs in Kirovohrad Oblast
Ukrainian reserve football teams
Defunct football clubs in Ukraine
Association football clubs established in 2013
Association football clubs disestablished in 2018
2013 establishments in Ukraine
2018 disestablishments in Ukraine